Komsan Pohkong is a lawyer from Thailand. He teach in faculty of law at Sukhothai Thammathirat Open University. In 2007, he was a member of Thai Constitution Drafting Committee 2007. He is also a member of Siam Prachapiwat (politic group) in Thailand.

History 
He was born on 3 July 1965. He graduated in doctoral degree of law from Chulalongkorn University. At now, he teach in faculty of law at Sukhothai Thammathirat Open University. In the free time, he like to shooting and play with his dog.

Employment 
Former Vice-Chancellor Affairs (Administration) in Sukhothai Thammathirat Open University
Expert Committee of the Constituent Assembly in Constituent Assembly 1997
Legal Advisor of Election Commission 1999-2000
Legal Advisor of Ministry of Education
Assistant to the President in Sukhothai Thammathirat Open University
Member of Thai Constitution Drafting Committee 2007

Royal decorations 
 - Commander (Third Class) of the Most Exalted Order of the White Elephant

References 

Komsan Pohkong
1965 births
Living people
Komsan Pohkong
Komsan Pohkong